Eugonus is a genus of fungus weevils in the beetle family Anthribidae. There are about 18 described species in Eugonus.

Species
These 18 species belong to the genus Eugonus:

 Eugonus adustus Poinar & Legalov, 2016
 Eugonus albofasciatus Motschulsky, 1874
 Eugonus angustus Poinar & Legalov, 2016
 Eugonus bicolor Valentine, 1972
 Eugonus bostrichoides Fahraeus, 1839
 Eugonus decorus Jordan, 1906
 Eugonus dermestoides Suffrian, 1870
 Eugonus diversipes Frieser, 1978
 Eugonus fallax Gemminger & Harold, 1872
 Eugonus languidus Frieser, 1978
 Eugonus ornatus Jordan, 1904
 Eugonus particolor Jordan, 1904
 Eugonus pictus Valentine, 1972
 Eugonus robustus Jordan, 1904
 Eugonus simplex Jordan, 1904
 Eugonus subcylindricus Fahraeus, 1839
 Eugonus tenuis Jordan, 1904
 Eugonus virgatus Gyllenhal, 1833

References

Further reading

 
 

Anthribidae
Articles created by Qbugbot